Bhatli (Koshali) is a Vidhan Sabha constituency of Bargarh district, Odisha, India.

This constituency includes Bhatli block, Sohela block and Ambabhona block.

Elected Members

Fifteen elections held during 1957 to 2019. List of members elected from this constituency are:

 2019: Susanta Singh (Biju Janata Dal)
 2014: Susanta Singh (Biju Janata Dal)
 2009: Susanta Singh (Biju Janata Dal)
 2004: Bimbadhar Kuanr (Bharatiya Janata Party)
 2000: Bimbadhar Kuanr (Bharatiya Janata Party)
 1995: Mohan Nag (Congress)
 1990: Kumar Behera (Janata Dal)
 1985: Mohan Nag (Congress)
 1980: Mohan Nag (Congress)-I
 1977: Bimbadhar Kuanr (Janata Party)
 1974: Mohan Nag (Congress)
 1971: Natabar Banchhor (Communist)
 1967: Saraswati Pradhan (Congress)
 1961: Saraswati Pradhan (Congress)
 1957: Natabar Banchhor (Communist)

2019 Election Result
In 2019 election, Biju Janata Dal candidate Susanta Singh defeated Bharatiya Janata Party candidate Irasis Acharya  by a margin of 23,232 votes.

2014 Election Result
In 2014 election, Biju Janata Dal candidate Susanta Singh defeated Independent candidate Sushant Mishra by a margin of 37,581 votes.

2009 Election Result
In 2009 election Biju Janata Dal candidate Susant Singh, defeated Indian National Congress candidate Prakash Chandra Debata by 4,771 votes.

Notes

References

Bargarh district
Assembly constituencies of Odisha